Tetracis barnesii is a moth of the family Geometridae. It is found from the high-desert riparian canyons in Colorado and Utah to the dry coniferous forest in Oregon on altitudes between 1,555 and 1,905 meters.

The length of the forewings 19–23 mm. Adults are on wing from early September to late October.

External links
Revision of the North American genera Tetracis Guenée and synonymization of Synaxis Hulst with descriptions of three new species (Lepidoptera: Geometridae: Ennominae)

Tetracis
Moths described in 1896